The Battle of Elli or the Battle of the Dardanelles took place near the mouth of the Dardanelles on  as part of the First Balkan War between the fleets of the Kingdom of Greece and the Ottoman Empire. It was the largest sea battle of the Balkan Wars.

Background
Since the start of the war the Hellenic Navy acted aggressively, while the Ottoman navy remained in the Dardanelles. Admiral Kountouriotis landed at Lemnos, while the Greek fleet liberated a series of islands. On 24 October (O.S.), Kountouriotis sent a telegram to the Ottoman admiral: "We have captured Tenedos. We await the exit of your fleet. If you need coal, I can supply you." On 3 December (OS), the Ottoman fleet left the Dardanelles.

Battle
The Royal Hellenic Navy, led by Rear Admiral Pavlos Kountouriotis on board of the flagship Averof, defeated the Ottoman Navy, led by Captain Ramiz Bey, just outside the entrance to the Dardanelles (Hellespont). During the battle, Kountouriotis, frustrated by the slow speed of the three older Greek battleships Hydra, Spetsai and Psara, hoisted the Z flag which stood for "Independent Action", and sailed forward alone at a speed of 20 knots, against the Ottoman fleet. Taking full advantage of her superior speed, guns and armour, Averof succeeded in crossing the Ottoman fleet's "T" and concentrated her fire against the Ottoman flagship Barbaros Hayreddin, thus forcing the Ottoman fleet to retreat in disorder. The Greek fleet, including the destroyers ,  and  continued to pursue the Ottoman fleet off-and-on between the dates of December 13 and December 26, 1912.

Aftermath
The Ottomans suffered 7 killed and 14 wounded on the Barbaros Hayreddin, 8 killed and 20 wounded on the Turgut Reis, and 3 dead and 7 wounded on the Mesudiye.

This victory was quite significant in that the Ottoman navy retreated within the Straits and left the Aegean Sea to the Greeks who were now free to liberate the islands of Lesbos, Chios, Lemnos and Samos and others. It also prevented any transfer of Ottoman troop reinforcements by sea and effectively secured Ottoman defeat on land.

See also 
Greek cruiser Elli (1912)
Greek cruiser Elli (1935)
Greek frigate Elli (F450)

References

Further reading
 
 

1912 in Greece
1912 in the Ottoman Empire
Elli
Elli
Elli
Elli
History of the Aegean Sea
History of the Dardanelles
December 1912 events